Sir William Arbuthnot, 1st Baronet of Edinburgh FRSE (24 December 1766 – 18 September 1829) was a Scottish landowner and politician. He served as Lord Provost of Edinburgh and Lord Lieutenant of the City of Edinburgh.

Life
William was the son of Robert Keith Arbuthnot FRSE (1728-1803) of Haddo Rattray, and Mary Urquhart of Cromarty. He was the elder brother of George Arbuthnot, 1st of Elderslie, and younger brother of Robert Arbuthnot FRSE (1760-1809).

He attended the Edinburgh High School 1773 to 1778.

He was elected a Fellow of the Royal Society of Edinburgh in January 1800, being proposed by John Playfair.

Arbuthnot managed a plantation on the island of Carriacou, in the Grenadines, on behalf of his uncle, William Urquhart of Craigston.

Sir William served twice as Lord Provost of Edinburgh, from 1815 to 1817 and from 1821 to 1823. On the death of his father, he became Secretary of the Board of Trustees for the Encouragement of the Manufactures and Fisheries of Scotland, a post later held by Sir Thomas Dick Lauder, Bt.

Traditionally a knighthood was conferred on Lord Provosts, but Arbuthnot was created a baronet on 24 August 1822 (Letters Patent 3 April 1823) on the occasion of a banquet given by the Magistrates and Town Council of Edinburgh in honour of King George IV during his visit to Edinburgh.

In his capacity as Lord Provost he opened the Edinburgh School of Arts on Adam Square on 16 October 1821.

Sir William Arbuthnot matriculated Arms with the Lord Lyon King of Arms in 1822. Unusually, for a baronet, the arms include supporters, probably because he had accomplished two stints as Lord Provost.

Sir William is buried in St John's Episcopal Churchyard in Edinburgh at the west end of Princes Street.

Family

Arbuthnot married Anne Alves (d.1846), daughter of John Alves of Shipland, on 13 September 1800. They had five children:

Sir Robert Keith Arbuthnot, 2nd Baronet (1801–1873)
John Alves Arbuthnot (1802–1875)
George Clerk Arbuthnot (1803–1876), married firstly Agnes Rait, daughter of John Rait on 7 November 1837, married secondly, Caroline Ramsay Hay, daughter of James Hay on 10 January 1845 and had Charles Ramsay Arbuthnot
Archibald Francis Arbuthnot (1805–1879), married Hon. Gertrude Sophia Gough, daughter of the 1st Viscount Gough on 12 December 1837 and had Major-General William Arbuthnot and Sir George Gough Arbuthnot
James Edward Arbuthnot (1809–1868), married Harriet Frances Staveley, daughter of William Staveley in June 1837

See also
Court of the Lord Lyon

References

External links

1766 births
1829 deaths
William Arbuthnot, Sir, 1st Baronet
Baronets in the Baronetage of the United Kingdom
Lord Provosts of Edinburgh
Politicians from Edinburgh
People educated at the Royal High School, Edinburgh
Fellows of the Royal Society of Edinburgh
Burials at St John's, Edinburgh